Brian John Dendle (1936–2013) was a British-born philologist and hispanist settled in the United States. He was professor of Spanish Literature of the University of Kentucky. His research focused on 19th and early 20th century literature and history, dealing with Spain but also with incursions in French and generic Spanish-language literature.

Biography 
Born in Oxford, England, on 30 March 1936, he graduated in Romance Languages from the University of Oxford in 1958. After a spell as lecturer in Jamaica and France he moved to the United States by 1961, and he earned a PhD from Princeton University in 1966. He joined the University of Kentucky in 1971. He was also a lecturer at Kenyon College, Princeton University, the University of Michigan and the University of Alabama. He was tenured in 1978. He retired in 2004.

He died on 3 September 2013 in Lexington, Kentucky.

Works 

  (republishing of his doctoral dissertation)

References 
Citations

Bibliography
 
 

Alumni of the University of Oxford
Princeton University alumni
University of Kentucky faculty
1936 births
2013 deaths
Hispanists